Named after the Norwegian explorer, the Roald Amundsen is a former Pullman Company private car; the last of seven Explorer-series cars built between 1927 and 1929 for the Pullman Company's pool of passenger cars. It was frequently used as the United States Presidential Rail Car, and was used for every president from Herbert Hoover through Dwight Eisenhower.

During World War II, sister car Ferdinand Magellan was rebuilt as the official presidential private car; after the war, the Roald Amundsen was surplus to the Pullman Company's requirements and was sold, and became a business car for the New York Central Railroad. In 1971 it was donated to the McCormick-Stillman Railroad Park in Scottsdale, Arizona.

In 2009 the Roald Amundsen was placed on the National Register of Historic Places.

References 
Bibliography
 Klara, Robert (2010). FDR's Funeral Train: A Betrayed Widow, a Soviet Spy, and a Presidency in the Balance

External links 
 Historic Significance and Integrity Assessment Report for the Roald Amundsen Pullman Car
 Scottsdale Railroad Museum
 FDR Funeral Train

Rail passenger cars of the United States
Private railroad cars
Transportation of the president of the United States